Lichenihabitans psoromatis is a species of Alphaproteobacteria.

References

Hyphomicrobiales